This article lists events that occurred during 1997 in Estonia.

Incumbents
President: Lennart Meri
Prime Minister: Tiit Vähi (until 17 March), Mart Siimann (from 17 March)

Events
 Tallinn Black Nights Film Festival begins.
 Euro University established.
 4 December – Tallinn Old Town added to UNESCO World Heritage List.
 13 December – six countries (including Estonia) invited to the European Union enlargement process. Negotiations related to Estonia begin on 31 March 1998.

Births
 8 October – Carmel Kallemaa, Canadian rhythmic gymnast

Deaths

See also
 1997 in Estonian football
 1997 in Estonian television

References

 
1990s in Estonia
Estonia
Estonia
Years of the 20th century in Estonia